Portrait of Benito Pérez Galdós ( is an oil portrait painting by Joaquín Sorolla in 1894. It represents the Spanish writer Benito Pérez Galdós at aged 51.

In 1973 it was acquired by the grandsons of Galdós for the Cabildo Insular de Gran Canaria. In 2014 it was temporarily moved to Museo del Prado for an exhibition. After the exhibition, the painting was shown to have minor damage from light, likely mobile phone flash, causing the colors to slightly dampen. Because of that, the painting was restored by museum staff.

References

1894 paintings
1894 in Spain
Paintings by Joaquín Sorolla